Feng Han (born 14 December 1985) is a Chinese former professional road cyclist and mountain biker. In mountain biking, he notably finished third at the national cross-country championships in 2008.

References

External links

1985 births
Living people
Chinese male cyclists
21st-century Chinese people